The Onyx Hotel is an historic structure located at 852 5th Avenue in San Diego's Gaslamp Quarter, in the U.S. state of California. It was built in 1910.

See also
 List of Gaslamp Quarter historic buildings

External links

 

1910 establishments in California
Hotel buildings completed in 1910
Buildings and structures in San Diego
Gaslamp Quarter, San Diego
Hotels in San Diego